Karizan-e Molla Ahmad (also Romanized as Kārīzān-e Mollā Aḩmad; also known as Kārīzān-e Mollā Moḩammad, Kārīzān, and Kārīzūn) is a village in Karizan Rural District, Nasrabad District, Torbat-e Jam County, Razavi Khorasan Province, Iran. At the 2006 census, its population was 246, made up of 65 families.

References 

Populated places in Torbat-e Jam County